The 2018 United States Senate election in Vermont was held November 6, 2018, alongside a gubernatorial election, U.S. House election, and other state and local elections. Incumbent independent Senator Bernie Sanders was re-elected to a third term. The primaries were held on August 14.

Background
Two-term independent Senator Bernie Sanders was re-elected with 71% of the vote in 2012. Sanders, a candidate for president in the 2016 primary election and one of only three independent members of Congress, is a self-described democratic socialist.

Sanders has caucused with the Democratic Party since taking office in 2007, and he is the Chairman of the Budget Committee. He was 77 years old in 2018. Sanders ran for the 2016 Democratic presidential nomination. After failing to win the nomination, he announced that he would run for re-election for his Senate seat in 2018.

Independents

Candidates
 Brad Peacock, farmer
 Bernie Sanders, incumbent U.S. Senator (caucuses with Democrats)

Endorsements

Democratic primary

Candidates

Nominee
Bernie Sanders, incumbent U.S. Senator (declined nomination)

Eliminated in primary
Folasade Adeluola, activist

Not on ballot
Jon Svitavsky, homelessness activist

Withdrawn
 Al Giordano, journalist

Results

Republican primary

Candidates

Nominee 
Lawrence Zupan, real estate broker

Withdrew nomination
H. Brooke Paige, former CEO of Remmington News Service

Eliminated in primary
 Rocky De La Fuente, businessman
 Jasdeep Pannu, attorney

Did not file
 John MacGovern, former Massachusetts State Representative and nominee for the U.S. Senate in 2012
 Scott Milne, businessman, nominee for Governor in 2014 and nominee for the U.S. Senate in 2016

Results

Post-primary
H. Brooke Paige, who also won the Republican nominations for U.S. House, state Attorney General, state Secretary of State, state Treasurer, and state Auditor, withdrew from all but the Secretary of State race on August 24, in order to allow the Vermont Republican Party to name replacement candidates. The Vermont Republican Party picked Lawrence Zupan, who came in 2nd place in the primary, to be the Republican nominee.

General election

Predictions 

*Highest rating given

Polling

Results
Sanders won re-election with 67.4% of the vote against eight other candidates.

See also
United States Senate elections, 2018
Vermont gubernatorial election, 2018

References

External links
Candidates at Vote Smart  
Candidates at Ballotpedia  
Campaign finance at FEC  
Campaign finance at OpenSecrets

Official campaign websites
Russell Beste (I) for Senate
Edward Gilbert Jr. (I) for Senate
Reid Kane (LUP) for Senate
Brad Peacock (I) for Senate
Bernie Sanders (I) for Senate
Jon Svitavsky (I) for Senate
Lawrence Zupan (R) for Senate

2018
Vermont
United States Senate
Bernie Sanders